The Fleet Requirements and Air Direction Unit (FRADU) was a unit of the Royal Navy's Fleet Air Arm operated by the contractor Serco Defence and Aerospace. It was established in 1972. It was most recently equipped with 13 BAE Systems Hawk T1 advanced jet trainer aircraft on lease to the Royal Navy from the Royal Air Force, based at RNAS Culdrose in Cornwall.  Two of these aircraft were permanently detached to Naval Flying Standards Flight (fixed wing) at RNAS Yeovilton where they are flown by RN pilots, but maintained by Serco engineers.

FRADU provided training for the Royal Navy by conducting simulated attacks on Royal Navy ships during Flag Officer Sea Training (FOST), Airborne Early Warning (AEW) exercises, training air controllers and Helicopter Fighter Affiliation training.

In June 2013, FRADU was redesignated 736 Naval Air Squadron.

History
The Fleet Requirements and Air Direction Training Unit (FRADTU) was formed in 1972 by the merger of the Fleet Requirements Unit (FRU) and the Air Direction Training Unit ADTU which were operated by Airwork Services for the RN.

In 1983, the contract for FRADU was offered to competitive tender; the contract was won by Flight Refuelling Ltd, Hurn.

The FRADU moved from RNAS Yeovilton, its home since 1972, to RNAS Culdrose in December 1995.

Aircraft

Hawker Hunter, GA.11, RNAS Yeovilton, December 1972 to May 1995
Hawker Hunter, T.7/T.8/T.8C, RNAS Yeovilton, December 1972 to May 1995
Hawker Hunter, T.8M (3 reworked Hunter T.8Cs fitted with the Sea Harrier's Blue Fox radar), RNAS Yeovilton, March 1983 to December 1994 (Note: Operated by 899NAS though still maintained by FRADU's engineers).
English Electric Canberra TT.18, RNAS Yeovilton, December 1972 to November 1992
de Havilland Sea Vixen, RNAS Yeovilton, December 1972 to February 1974 
Canberra T.4, RNAS Yeovilton, December 1972 to April 1986
Canberra T.22 (reworked Canberra PR.7), RNAS Yeovilton, November 1973 to September 1985
BAE Systems Hawk T1 advanced jet trainer, RNAS Yeovilton, April 1994-November 1995. RNAS Culdrose, December 1995-June 2013.

References

External links
Royal Navy FRADU page
FRADU Hunters
History of the FRADU

Naval aviation education

Military units and formations established in 1972
Military units and formations disestablished in 2013